Andinia may refer to:
 Andinia (plant), an orchid genus in the family Orchidaceae
 Andinia (gastropod), a land snail genus in the family Clausiliidae
 Andinia Plan, an alleged plan to establish a Jewish state in parts of Argentina